Girls, Girls, Girls is the fourth studio album by American rock band Mötley Crüe, released on May 15, 1987. The album contains the hit singles "Girls, Girls, Girls", "You're All I Need", and the MTV favorite "Wild Side". It was the band's final collaboration with producer Tom Werman, who had produced the band's two previous albums, Shout at the Devil and Theatre of Pain. Like those albums, Girls, Girls, Girls would achieve quadruple platinum status, selling over 4 million copies and reaching number two on the Billboard 200. The album marked a change to a blues-rock influenced sound, which was met with positive reception.

Reception

Girls, Girls, Girls has received mixed but generally positive reviews. In their June 12, 1987, issue The Georgia Straight applauded Mick Mars' guitar being featured more prominently in the final mix than it had been on 1985's Theatre of Pain, and called it their best work since 1981's Too Fast for Love. The publication said that the album "has recaptured some of the excitement of their first release on tunes like 'Dancing on Glass', 'Five Years Dead', and the title track, which sports a catchy guitar riff a la Aerosmith's 'Draw the Line'."

AllMusic's Steve Huey gave the album a rating of four stars and states: "Girls, Girls, Girls continued Mötley Crüe's commercial hot streak, eventually going quadruple platinum as its predecessor, Theatre of Pain, had; meanwhile, the title track brought them their second Top 20 single, and 'Wild Side' became a popular MTV item."

The album peaked at No. 2 on the Billboard charts. On the week it might have reached No. 1, Whitney Houston's second album, Whitney, debuted at the top of the charts. Eventually, the group's next album Dr. Feelgood (1989) would go on to claim the top Billboard spot. The album was also the band's third straight album to go quadruple platinum, after Shout at the Devil and Theatre of Pain.

Metal Hammer placed the album on their list of The Top 20 Best Metal Albums of 1987, and called it "an arena-rock juggernaut".

Track listing

Personnel

Mötley Crüe
Vince Neil – lead vocals
Mick Mars – guitars, backing vocals
Nikki Sixx – bass, backing vocals
Tommy Lee – drums, piano, backing vocals

Additional musicians
Bob Carlisle, Dave Amato, John Purdell, Pat Torpey, Phyllis St. James, Tommy Funderburk – backing vocals

Production
Tom Werman – producer
Duane Baron – engineer, mixing
Richard McKernon, Ross Hogarth, Toby Wright – assistant engineers
Bob Ludwig – vinyl mastering at Masterdisk, New York
Stephen Innocenzi – CD mastering

In popular culture
"Wild Side" is featured in the video game Grand Theft Auto IV: The Lost and Damned.
 The title track also appears in the Rocksmith 2014 video game.

Charts

Certifications

References

Mötley Crüe albums
1987 albums
Elektra Records albums
Albums produced by Tom Werman